Anta Rugāte (born Antonija Lūriņa on April 16, 1949 in Rundēni parish) is a Latvian journalist and politician. Rugāte served as a deputy of the Saeima.

References

Women deputies of the Saeima
1949 births
Living people